The Killer is a 1921 American silent Western film directed by Jack Conway and Howard C. Hickman and starring Claire Adams, Jack Conway and Frankie Lee.

Plot 
After being charged with murder, Henry Hooper flees to the border zone of Arizona and Sonora. Hooper successfully lures his former business partner John Emory and his children Ruth and Bobby to him. Once the Emorys arrive, Hooper has his henchman Ramon kill John and destroy their business papers. The children are rescued by the rancher William Sanborn, while Hooper is killed.

Cast
 Claire Adams as Ruth Emory 
 Jack Conway as William Sanborn 
 Frankie Lee as Bobby Emory 
 Frank Campeau as Henry Hooper 
 Tod Sloan as Artie Brower 
 Edward Peil Sr. as Ramon 
 Frank Hayes as Windy Smith 
 Will Walling as John Emory 
 Milton Ross as Buck Johnson 
 Tom Ricketts as Tim Westmore 
 Zack Williams as Aloysius Jackson

References

Bibliography
 Goble, Alan. The Complete Index to Literary Sources in Film. Walter de Gruyter, 1999.

External links
 

1921 films
1921 Western (genre) films
Films directed by Jack Conway
Films directed by Howard C. Hickman
1920s English-language films
Pathé Exchange films
American black-and-white films
Silent American Western (genre) films
Films set in Arizona
Films set in Mexico
1920s American films
Films with screenplays by Richard Schayer